The AKC National Championship is held by the American Kennel Club every year in December or January in the US since 2001. Over 5,000 dogs from all over the world come to compete, but only seven go to best in show.  

The 2021 AKC National Championship was livestreamed on AKC.TV on December 18-19 2021. The show premiered on ABC on January 2 2021 at 2 p.m. EST.

Its primary sponsor is dog food brand Royal Canin. It used to be sponsored by Eukanuba, a premium brand of dog food, but Royal Canin took over as lead sponsor in 2016.

History
The first National Championship was held in Orlando, Florida in 2001. The 2002 show was also in Orlando. The next show was held in 2003 and was in Long Beach, California. The two 2006 shows were held in Tampa, Florida (the show switched from being held in January to being held in December, which explains why there were two shows, and therefore two winners, in 2006).

With 2020 being hosted in Orlando, the championships will be held behind closed doors for the first time. In 2020, the Whippet became the first breed to win the title of Best in Show at the AKC National Championship more than once. In the most recent show (December 2021), a Giant Schnauzer named Bayou won.

Past champions
Best in Show:

See also
National Dog Show
Westminster Dog Show

Notes

External links
 AKC Championship website
 AKC Championship Landing Page
 AKC National Championship Livestream

Dog shows and showing